Lewis was an American satellite which was to have been operated by NASA as part of the Small Satellite Technology Initiative. It carried two experimental Earth imaging instruments, and an ultraviolet astronomy payload. Due to a design flaw it failed within three days of reaching orbit, before it became operational.

Lewis was a  spacecraft, which was designed to operate for between one and three years. It was built by TRW under a contract which was signed on 11 July 1994. Its primary instruments were the Hyperspectral Imager, the Linear Etalon Imaging Spectral Array and the Ultraviolet Cosmic Background experiment. A number of technology demonstration payloads were also flown.

Launch
Lewis was launched by a LMLV-1 (Athena I) rocket flying from Space Launch Complex 6 at the Vandenberg Air Force Base. The launch was originally scheduled to take place in September 1996, but it was delayed due to technical problems affecting the rocket.

Mission failure
On 26 August, the satellite began spinning out of control at a rate of 2 rpm, which led to a loss of communications with ground controllers, and affected the ability of its solar arrays to generate power. Controllers were unable to regain contact with the spacecraft, and it was declared a total loss. It reentered the atmosphere at 11:58 GMT on 28 September 1997. The cause of the failure was later established to be a design flaw in the spacecraft's attitude control system, which had been designed for the TOMS-EP spacecraft and was not sufficiently modified to be compatible with Lewis.

See also

 1997 in spaceflight

References

Spacecraft launched in 1997